Ruben Sanchez Montero (born 3 July 1987) is a Spanish former football striker, coach and actual businessman.

Playing career

Early career
Sanchez Montero was born in Madrid, Spain. Heighted at 1.92 m, he came through the Atletico de Madrid youth system. Whilst in Atlético de Madrid's youth rosters, he played against players as Cesc Fabregas, Gerard Piqué and Antonio Adan. As an 18-year-old, Sanchez Montero entered into Italian Football to play in the Serie B. Posterior to this, he marched to play in Switzerland.

Levante
In the 2008–09 Segunda División season, Sanchez Montero played for Levante. He made five appearances and scored one goal against Elche.

Sportivo Luqueño
In the 2008 Sportivo Luqueño roster, Sanchez Montero colleagued with Arístides Florentín, Celso Esquivel, Argentines Javier Liendo and Valentin Filippini and United States goalkeeper Bryan Lopez. Whilst at Sportivo Luqueño, he did not appear in the 2008 Copa Libertadores.

Latter career and retirement
In August 2011, Sanchez Montero joined a 21-man roster at Villanovense in the Segunda B. In December 2011, Coruxo signed Sanchez Montero in the Segunda División B. He joined the team to cover the absence of strikers Cakovic and Javi Zurbano.

Sandecja Nowy Sącz
On 29 September 2012, Sanchez Montero debuted in Poland's I liga for Sandecja Nowy Sącz in a 2–0 home defeat against GKS Katowice, playing 90 minutes and wearing the number 10 jersey. On 6 October 2012, he started in a 4–0 away defeat against Stomil Olsztyn, playing until the 46th minute before being substituted off of the field for Sebastian Szczepanski. On 18 November 2012, Sanchez Montero made his last appearance for Sandecja Nowy Sącz in a 1–0 away defeat against Kolejarz Stróże, when he was substituted onto the field for Filip Burkhardt in the 63rd minute.

He then decided to retire, after making seven appearances in the 2012–13 I liga.

Coaching career
Following his retirement, Sanchez Montero worked as a coach for Madrid-based club Vicalvaro.

Style of play
Sanchez Montero plays as an attacking midfielder and likes to be creative on the field.

Television
Sanchez Montero appeared on Spanish television reality show La Isla de las Tentaciones, making appearances in the first and third seasons of the competition.

Personal life
Sanchez Montero is from barrio de Mejorada in Madrid. His favourite football club is Atlético de Madrid. His favourite players are Zinedine Zidane and Andres Iniesta.

References

External links
 
 
 PlayMaker Stats Profile
 

Sportivo Luqueño players
Expatriate footballers in Paraguay
Spanish footballers
Spanish expatriate footballers
Spanish expatriate sportspeople in Paraguay
Association football forwards
1987 births
Living people
Footballers from Madrid